The Archparchy of Ivano-Frankivsk (or Ivano-Frankivsk of the Ukrainians) is an ecclesiastical territory or ecclesiastical province of the Ukrainian Greek Catholic Church — a particular Eastern Catholic Church, that is located in the western part of Ukraine in the provinces of Ivano-Frankivsk and Chernivtsi. It was erected in 2011. As a metropolitan see, it has two suffragan sees: Kolomyia and Chernivtsi. The incumbent ordinary of the archeparchy is Volodymyr Viytyshyn who was confirmed by Pope Benedict XVI on 2 June 2005. It is assisted and protected by the Dicastery for the Eastern Churches in Rome. The cathedral church of the archeparchy is the Cathedral of the Resurrection of Our Saviour which is situated in the eponymous city of Ivano-Frankivsk.

History 
 Established on March 26, 1885 as Eparchy of Stanislaviv/ Stanislaviv / Ivano-Frankivs’k / Stanislaopolitan(us) (Latin adjective), on territory split off from the Ukrainian Catholic Archeparchy of Lviv, as suffragan see in the ecclesiastical province of Kyiv-Halych.
 November 9, 1962: Renamed as Eparchy of Ivano-Frankivsk.
 April 20, 1993: Lost territory to establish the Ukrainian Catholic Eparchy of Kolomyia – Chernivtsi, now its suffragan.
 Elevated on December 13, 2011 as Metropolitan Archeparchy of Ivano-Frankivsk/ Stanislaviv / Ivano-Frankivs’k / Stanislaopolitan(us) (Latin).

Ecclesiastical province 
The metropolis has two suffragan sees :
 Ukrainian Catholic Eparchy of Chernivtsi
 Ukrainian Catholic Eparchy of Kolomyia.

Statistics 
As per 2014, it pastorally served 591,157 Catholics (75.8% of 780,117 total) on 6,700 km² in 390 parishes and 55 missions with 457 priests (423 diocesan, 34 religious), 173 lay religious (52 brothers, 121 sisters) and 90 seminarians.

Episcopal Ordinaries and Auxiliary bishops 
 Eparchs (Bishops) of Stanislaviv/Ivano-FrankivskYulian Pelesh (27 March 1885 – 22 Sep 1891)
Julian Sas-Kuilovsky (22 Sep 1891 – 19 June 1899) 
Andrey Sheptytsky, O.S.B.M. (19 June 1899 – 17 Dec 1900) 
Blessed Hryhoriy Khomyshyn (6 May 1904 – 17 Jan 1947) 
auxiliary bishop Ivan Lyatyshevskyi (24 Nov 1929 – 27 Nov 1957)In 1946 the Soviet Union prohibited the Greek Catholic Church; all of its properties were appropriated by the Russian Orthodox ChurchBlessed Ivan Slezyuk (April 1945 – 02 Dec 1973) 
Blessed Symeon Lukach (April 1945 – 22 August 1964) 
Auxiliary bishops:Stepan Vaprovych (April 1945 – 2 March 1964); *Hryhoriy Balahurak (April 1945 – 02 Oct 1965); *Yosafat Fedoryk (1964 – 28 Dec 1979); Sofron Dmyterko (30 Nov 1968 – 16 Jan 1991); Pavlo Vasylyk (1 May 1974 – 16 Jan 1991); Yakiv Tymchuk (1977 – 20 Dec 1988); Iryney Bilyk (15 August 1989 – 16 Jan 1991) On 16 January 1991, the Holy See publicly confirmed all clandestine consecrationsSofron Dmyterko, O.S.B.M. (16 Jan 1991 – 07 Nov 1997) 
Auxiliary bishops: Pavlo Vasylyk; Iryney Bilyk; Sofron Mudry; Volodymyr Viytyshyn
Sofron Mudry (7 November 1997 - 2 June 2005)
 Volodymyr Viytyshyn (2 June 2005 - 21 November 2011)
 Metropolitan Archeparchs of Ivano-Frankivsk''
 Volodymyr Viytyshyn (21 November 2011 – present)
 Auxiliary bishop: Yosafat Moschych

Gallery of eparchies

See also 
 List of Catholic dioceses in Ukraine

Sources and external links 
 Profile at GCatholic.org

Ukrainian Catholic Archeparchy of Ivano-Frankivsk
2005 establishments in Ukraine